Torre d'Arese is a comune (municipality) in the Province of Pavia in the Italian region Lombardy, located about 25 km southeast of Milan and about 15 km northeast of Pavia.

Torre d'Arese borders the following municipalities: Magherno, Marzano, Valera Fratta, Villanterio, Vistarino.

References

Cities and towns in Lombardy